Sarah Masen is the first major-label studio album by the singer/songwriter Sarah Masen, released on June 25, 1996. It is her second album, overall.

Critical reception

Rodney Batdorf of AllMusic writes that, "Sarah Masen's self-titled album showcases her emotional, moving vocals, as well as her evocative lyrics." and finishes with, "the album suggests that she'll blossom into one of the most creative and lovely CCM talents of the latter-half of the '90s."

This album peaked at no. 27 on October 12, 1996 on Billboard's Top Christian Albums.

Jan Willem Vink writes in his Cross Rhythms interview with Masen that, "There's something more compelling about Sarah Masen than the simple fact that she's the first artist to be signed to Charlie Peacock's new label Re:Think. In fact, her self-titled album needed only a few of Charlie's wide range of production twists to expose its class."

Track listing

At the beginning of the CD there is a 32:11 hidden track which contains interactive multimedia and video footage that can be accessed on the CD-Rom drives of most Mac and Windows computers.
Track information and credits verified from the album's liner notes.

Personnel 
 Sarah Masen – vocals, backing vocals (5, 9, 10)
 Tim Lauer – Wurlitzer electric piano (1, 3, 6), Hammond B3 organ (1, 3-6, 9, 10), pump organ (3, 5, 9), harmonica (5)
 Charlie Peacock – Wurlitzer electric piano (2), backing vocals (5)
 Matt Hudson – electric guitar (1, 3, 5, 7, 8, 10)
 Jerry McPherson – electric guitar (1-6, 9)
 George Cocchini – guitar solo (1), electric guitar solo (4), electric guitar (7, 8, 9)
 Gary Burnette – acoustic guitar (3, 6, 7, 9, 10), mandolin (3, 10), electric guitar (10)
 Mark Hill – bass
 Dave Masen – drums (1, 3-8, 10)
 Chris McHugh – drums (1, 2, 9)
 Eric Darken – percussion (1, 3, 4, 6, 10)
 Kristin Wilkinson – viola (2)
 David Davidson – violin (2)
 Doug Moffet – clarinet (5)
 Molly Ashworth – backing vocals (5)
 Sam Ashworth – backing vocals (5)
 Brent Bourgeois – backing vocals (6, 10)
 Molly Felder – backing vocals (6, 10)

Handclaps on "Break Hard the Wishbone"
 Molly Ashworth, Nick Barré, Mark Hill, Katy Krippaehne, Sarah Masen, Chris McHugh, Charlie Peacock and Jay Swartzendruber

Production 
 Charlie Peacock – producer 
 Shane D. Wilson – recording, mixing 
 Richard Rose – recording assistant, mix assistant 
 Terry Watson – recording assistant, mix assistant 
 Ken Love – mastering at MasterMix (Nashville, Tennessee)
 Katy Krippaehne – production coordinator 
 Andi Ashworth – budget administration
 Nick Barré – art direction 
 Unidea Design – design, additional photography 
 Ron Keith – cover photography

References

External links
Sarah Masen Official Site
 re:think Official Site

1996 albums